

Sigma Boötis, its name Latinized from σ Boötis, is a single star in the northern constellation of Boötes. It has a yellow-white hue and is visible to the naked eye with an apparent visual magnitude of 4.46. Located to the southeast of Rho Boötis, the dwarf Sigma may at first appear as a naked-eye double, but the angular proximity with Rho is merely line-of-sight. Sigma Boötis is located at a distance of 51.1 light years from the Sun based on parallax. The star has a relatively high proper motion and is traversing the sky at the rate of  yr−1.

The stellar classification of Sigma Boötis is F4VkF2mF1. This notation is used for so-called "metal-weak" stars, Am stars with absorption lines of some metals weaker than expected in comparison with other spectral features.  The 'F4V', indicating an F-type main-sequence star, is derived from the hydrogen spectral lines and the shape of the metallic lines, the 'kF2' meaning it has the Calcium K line strength of an F2 star and 'mF1' showing it has the metallic line strength of an F1 star. It is around twice as luminous as a comparable zero age main sequence star, which may indicate it is near the end of its main sequence lifetime.

Sigma Boötis is a solar-type star but is larger and more massive than the Sun. It has an estimated age of around two to three billion years and is spinning with a projected rotational velocity of 7 km/s. There is some evidence of variation in radial velocity as well as rotational modulation of active latitudes. The star is radiating 3.5 times the luminosity of the Sun from its photosphere at an effective temperature of 6,594 K. It appears to be a source for X-ray emission.

However, the HOSTS Survey with the Large Binocular Telescope reported a detection of an excess in the far infrared, indicating the presence of exozodiacal dust near the habitable zone of the star.

Nomenclature
Sigma Boötis is known by several different names, including  σ Boo, 28 Boötis, BD+30°2536, GC 19659, GJ 557, HD 128167, HIP 71284, HR 5447, SAO 83416, and CCDM 14347+2945.

Chinese name

References

External links
 HR 5447
 CCDM J14347+2945
 Image Sigma Boötis

F-type main-sequence stars
Am stars
Suspected variables

Boötes
Bootis, Sigma
BD+30 2536
Bootis, 28
0557
128167
071284
5447
Gěng Hé èr